Amery is a rail siding and townsite  northeast of Dowerin in the Wheatbelt region of Western Australia.

It was an important junction for the railway line going north to Mullewa and the line going east to Wyalkatchem.

History
Amery was first known as "Ejanding" in 1910. Its name was changed to Amery in 1928, apparently because another railway siding approximately  further north was to be named Ejanding.

A newspaper that included the name of Amery was the Dowerin guardian and Amery line advocate, which was published between 1927 and 1958.

References

Towns in Western Australia
Shire of Dowerin
Rail junctions in Western Australia